Nevodnoye is a rural locality (a selo) in Nikolayevsky Selsoviet, Mikhaylovsky District, Altai Krai, Russia. The population was 212 as of 2013. There are 4 streets.

Geography 
Nevodnoye is located 43 km northwest of Mikhaylovskoye (the district's administrative centre) by road. Irkutsky is the nearest rural locality.

References 

Rural localities in Mikhaylovsky District, Altai Krai